"Fascination" is the first single released by Danish pop group Alphabeat. It was first released in Denmark on 6 June 2006, followed by a worldwide release on 16 May 2008. The song reached number 6 on the UK Singles Chart.

It was used as the music for a Coca-Cola advert. In Turkey, the song was used in an advertising campaign for Coca-Cola Zero, in Germany and Belgium for Coca-Cola Light. The Bimbo Jones Mix of the song was played in American Eagle Stores in the United States. It is also a playable song in the video game Band Hero and is available to play in the video game Rock Band 2 via downloadable content.

The song was also sung by all remaining contestants from series 6 of the British singing contest The X Factor, in week 3 of the live results shows. In 2010, Alphabeat performed the song on the Danish version of the show.

UK promotion 
Alphabeat released the song in the UK in anticipation of the international edition of their debut album. They performed the song on GMTV around the time of release and were interviewed by Fiona Phillips and Ben Shephard. On the day of release, Alphabeat performed the song on Channel 4 teatime show Richard & Judy.

Chart performance 
The song debuted at number 23 on the UK Singles Chart. It then rose to number seven after its physical release. A week later, it peaked at number six, fell to number 13 the following week, then rose to number 10, and for several weeks after hovered outside the top 10 at number 12 and 13. On 24 August 2008, the song rose 14 places from 73 to 59, nearly six months after it was released. The British Phonographic Industry awarded the song a Gold certification in August 2018.

Official remixes 
All officially released remixes/edits (released on various promo singles) are listed below:
 Fascination (Alphabeat vs. Frankmusik Main)
 Fascination (Alphabeat vs. Frankmusik Edit)
 Fascination (Alphabeat vs. Frankmusik Alternative Edit)
 Fascination (Alternative Edit) (Him Up Her Down)
 Fascination (Bimbo Jones Main)
 Fascination (Bimbo Jones Edit)
 Fascination (The Count & Sinden Remix)
 Fascination (Instrumental)
 Fascination (Linus Loves Dub)
 Fascination (Linus Loves Main)
 Fascination (Linus Loves Edit)
 Fascination (Muzzle Flash Remix)

Charts

Weekly charts

Year-end charts

Certifications

References 

2006 debut singles
2006 songs
2008 singles
Alphabeat songs
Charisma Records singles